Asha Addo is a town located in Awdal, Somaliland.

Demographics
As of 2012, the population of Asha Addo has been estimated to be 421. The town inhabitants belong to the Somali ethnic group, with the Gadabuursi and Issa clan sharing the town.

See also
Administrative divisions of Somaliland
Regions of Somaliland
Districts of Somaliland

References

Populated places in Awdal